TeamSport is an indoor go karting company operating 35 racing circuits across the United Kingdom. It was founded in 1992, opening its first track in Guildford, and is now the UK's largest indoor go karting company.

TeamSport has 32 tracks located throughout the United Kingdom, including five in London (London Docklands, West London, London Tower Bridge, North London and in Mitcham, South London), as well as in Basildon, Birmingham, Brighton, Bristol, Crawley, Cardiff, Dunstable, Farnborough, Gosport, Harlow, Leeds, Liverpool, Newcastle, Nottingham, Reading, Southampton, Warrington, Manchester, Preston, Coventry, Stoke-on-Trent and Sheffield.

TeamSport's portfolio of racing tracks range between 375 and 1,000 metres in length, and offer features including tunnels, multiple levels and chicanes.

In 2011, TeamSport opened London's first 'eco track' at Tower Bridge, using lithium battery-powered eco-karts capable of reaching speeds of up to 40 mph.

TeamSport's circuits have attracted a number of famous motorsport drivers over the years, including Formula One World Championship winner John Surtees, former Force India driver Adrian Sutil, as well as Mark Webber and Damon Hill.

Team Sport Warrington is currently the largest purpose-built indoor go karting track in the UK.

References

External links 
TeamSport website

Companies based in Surrey
Entertainment companies established in 1992